Erythronium klamathense is a rare species of flowering plant in the lily family known by the common name Klamath fawn lily. It is native to northern California (Shasta and Siskiyou Counties) and southern Oregon (Jackson, Josephine, Klamath, Douglas and Lane Counties),  where it grows in the Klamath Mountains and the southernmost peaks of the Cascade Range.

Description
Erythronium klamathense is a perennial herb growing from a bulb and producing generally two wavy-edged, narrow leaves up to 17 centimeters long. The inflorescence arises on an erect stalk up to 20 centimeters tall, with one to three flowers per stalk. The flower has tepals 2 or 3 centimeters long which are white with yellow bases, turning pinkish with age. The long, protruding stamens have large pale yellow anthers.

References

External links
Photo gallery

klamathense
Flora of the Klamath Mountains
Flora of California
Flora of Oregon
Plants described in 1940
Endemic flora of the United States